Myint Naing (born 5 July 1968) is a Burmese politician who currently serves as  an Amyotha Hluttaw MP for Rakhine State  No. 5 constituency. He is a member of Rakhine National Party.

Early life and education
He was born on 5 July 1968 in Kyauktaw, Rakhine State, Burma (Myanmar). He graduated with B.A. (Hist) from Sittwe University. His previous job was in the military service.

Political career
He is a member of the Rakhine National Party. In the 2015 Myanmar general election, he was elected as an Amyotha Hluttaw MP and elected representative from Rakhine State № 5 preliminary constituency.

References

Arakan National Party politicians
1968 births
Living people
People from Rakhine State
Arakanese politicians